Samuel Iván Elvir Zúñiga (born 25 April 2001) is a Honduran professional footballer who plays as a midfielder for UPNFM.

References

Living people
2001 births
Honduran footballers
Association football midfielders
Liga Nacional de Fútbol Profesional de Honduras players
Lobos UPNFM players
Footballers at the 2020 Summer Olympics
Olympic footballers of Honduras